Kirov is a Slavic male surname, its feminine counterpart is Kirova. It may refer to
Aleksandar Kirov (born 1990), Bulgarian association football player
Aleksandr Kirov (born 1984), Kazakhstani association football player
Anton Kirov (born 1990), Bulgarian association football player
Atanas Kirov (born 1946), Bulgarian Olympic weightlifter
Ivaylo Kirov (1947–2010), Bulgarian Olympic basketball player
Lyudmil Kirov (born 1976), Bulgarian association football player
Nikolay Kirov (born 1957), Russian Olympic runner
Nino Kirov (1945–2008), Bulgarian chess grandmaster
Panayot Kirov (born 1958), Bulgarian Olympic wrestler
Petar Kirov (born 1942), Bulgarian Olympic wrestler
Sergey Kirov (1886–1934), Russian revolutionary 
Vasil Kirov (born 1975), Bulgarian association football player

See also
Kurov (surname)